Manayka was an unincorporated community located in Harrison County, West Virginia, United States. Its post office opened on July 17, 1917 and closed on January 15, 1928.

References 

Ghost towns in West Virginia
Geography of Harrison County, West Virginia